Mian Choqa or Mian Cheqa or Mian Chaqa may refer to:

Mian Choqa, Kermanshah
Mian Choqa, Lorestan